Tenagogonus is a genus of Water Striders.

Species
 Tenagogonus ceylonensis Hungerford & Matsuda, 1962
 Tenagogonus nicobarensis Andersen, 1964
 Tenagogonus venkataramani Jehamalar & Chandra, 2013

References

Gerrini
Gerromorpha genera